The Lunatics is a 1986 Hong Kong drama film written and directed by Yee Tung-Shing in his directorial debut.

Plot 
A mentally ill man named Doggie causes a disturbance while playing at a fish market when the police think that he has taken a woman hostage with a cleaver. Mr. Tsui arrives and calms the situation down enough so that Doggie can be taken into custody. Miss Lau, a Hong Kong journalist, observes this and becomes interested in the work of Mr. Tsui, a psychiatrist who donates his time to help the mentally ill, many of them living on the streets.

Together, Mr. Tsui and Miss Lau visit Tsuen, a patient who claims to be rehabilitated. Tsuen says that the Castle Peak mental health facility is nice but upon release it is easy for patients to forget to take their medication in their new environment. He has been out and living in his own place for a year but his wife has left him and only allows him one supervised visit with his young son per month. Tsuen asks Mr. Tsui to help him gain more time with his son, but Mr. Tsui reminds him that it is a court decision.

Chung, a chainsmoker who collects cigarette butts from ashtrays, flees when he sees Mr. Tsui coming. Mr. Tsui follows him back to his shanty, where his daughter has measles. They bring her to the hospital, where Mr. Tsui asks Chung about his son. Chung insists that he did not kill his son and leads Mr. Tsui and the police to a spot in the woods where his son is buried. Mr. Tsui confronts Ah Ming, a doctor who prescribed medicine for hepatitis to Chung but did not know that it was intended for his son. Ah Ming explains that he witnessed the birth of Chung's children and has always cared for them.

Tsuen attempts to take Ah Hei on an unscheduled trip to the store for his birthday but his ex-wife catches him and chastises Ah Hei's teacher Miss Li for allowing it to happen. A physical confrontation arises between Tsuen and his ex-wife's new husband, after which his ex-wife says that she will file an injunction against Tsuen's visitation rights. Tsuen returns home with a bump on his head and begins talking to himself and breaking the necks of chickens brought to him by his mother, who eventually agrees to take him to the hospital when she finds him crouching in the shower biting into a chicken.

At the hospital, Tsuen puts on a good show in front of the doctor and is released without being sent to Castle Peak, but outside the hospital he disappears for several hours before Mr. Tsui finds him. Miss Lau writes a story for the newspaper about Tsuen's routine of breaking the necks of chicken, causing his neighbors to form a mob and confront Tsuen at his apartment. They begin yelling at Tsuen's mother and Tsuen attempts to defend her with meat cleavers, leading to a chaotic confrontation in which many people are hurt, including Tsuen's mother.

Tsuen flees to his son's school and locks the door behind him. The mob bangs on the door and Miss Li attempts to open it to escape, causing Tsuen to kill her with a cleaver. A policeman breaks through a window but Tsuen kills him with the cleaver so Mr. Tsui grabs the policeman's gun and shoots Tsuen.

Mr. Tsui attempts to resign but his boss doesn't want to accept his resignation because he is the only social worker left on his side. He is then informed that Doggie's parents called to say that he wants to commit suicide. Mr. Tsui finds him at the fish market but when a photographer uses a flash bulb Doggie becomes alarmed and swings a cleaver into Mr. Tsui, killing him. Mr. Tsui's patients and acquaintances attend his funeral, after which Miss Lau begins looking after the mentally ill on the streets of Hong Kong.

Cast

 Fung Shui-Fan as Mr. Tsui
 Deannie Ip as Tina Lau
 Paul Chun Pui as Tsuen
 Chow Yun-Fat as Chung
 John Sham Kin-Fun as Dr. Shum
 Tony Leung Chiu-wai as Doggie
 Season Ma as Miss Li
 Dennis Chan as Ming
 Ma Suk-Jan as crazy old woman
 Lai Suen as Tsuen's mother
 Lo Hung as doctor examining Tsuen
 Cheung Hei as lunatic friend
 Wan Seung-Lam as Zhao
 Lui Hung as customer of Zhao
 Jeffrey Ho Wai-Lung as new husband of Tsuen's ex-wife
 Ng Kwok-Kin as policeman
 Cho Yuen-Tat as journalist
 Cheung Bing-Chuen as angry tenant

Reception
Reviewer Andrew Saroch of fareastfilms.com gave the film 5/5 stars, calling it "quite simply one of the most important films to come out of Hong Kong and certainly one of the most harrowing", "essential viewing for every film buff", and "a superb mixture of social conscience and expert film-making."

TV Guide gave the film 3/4 stars, calling it "a well-made, consciousness-raising film whose theme is frequently overlooked in the movies: mental illness."

In his book A Different Brilliance: The D&B Story, author Po Fung wrote, "adopting a social realist approach, The Lunatics offered a gritty portrayal of the dismal living conditions of one of the most marginalised groups in Hong Kong known as the mentally ill."

Awards and nominations

References

External links

1987 films
1987 directorial debut films
1987 drama films
Hong Kong drama films
Films about journalists
Films directed by Derek Yee
Films set in Hong Kong
Films shot in Hong Kong
Films about homelessness
Films about intellectual disability
Films about social issues
1980s Hong Kong films